Awad El Karim Makki (born 12 June 1992) is a Sudanese sprinter.

He won the bronze medal over 400 metres at the 2009 World Youth Championships in Athletics.

References

External links

1992 births
Living people
People from Khartoum
Sudanese male sprinters